Aquia District is one of fifteen districts of the province Bolognesi in Peru.

Geography 
The Cordillera Blanca and the Wallanka mountain range traverse the district. Some of the highest peaks of the district are listed below:

See also
 Yanaqucha

References

Districts of the Bolognesi Province
Districts of the Ancash Region